Emily O'Reilly is an author and former journalist and broadcaster who became Ireland's first female Ombudsman in 2003, succeeding Kevin Murphy. On 3 July 2013, she was voted European Ombudsman by the European Parliament. She was re-elected in 2014 and in 2019, in each case for a mandate of five more years. She was educated at University College Dublin, Trinity College Dublin, and Harvard University, where she was awarded a Nieman Fellowship in journalism.

Journalism
She began her career as a journalist in the 1970s. Since then, she has held senior positions with The Irish Press and the Sunday Tribune, as well as serving as a political columnist at The Sunday Times and as the Political Editor of The Sunday Business Post. In 1991 she made an extended appearance on the British television discussion programme After Dark, alongside among others Patrick Cosgrave, J. P. Donleavy, David Norris and Francis Stuart.

In 1998, she became the editor of Magill magazine. She resigned in September 1999 when the magazine's sister publication, In Dublin, was banned by the Censorship of Publications Appeal Board for advertising brothels and prostitution services. O'Reilly was also a broadcaster on Raidió Teilifís Éireann (RTÉ) and Today FM.

In the course of her journalistic career, she won two awards: Journalist of the Year and Woman Journalist of the Year.

Irish Ombudsman and Information Commissioner
On 1 June 2003, she received her Warrant of Appointment as Irish Ombudsman and Information Commissioner from the then President of Ireland, Mary McAleese, at Áras an Uachtaráin. She has said of her job title, "I will be an ombudswoman but will have no difficulty in being referred to as either".

From 2007 O'Reilly was also appointed Commissioner for Environmental Information under the Access to Information on the Environment Regulations (S.I. No. 133 of 2007).

She retired from these positions and was succeeded by Peter Tyndall in December 2013.

Transparency and accountability of Irish public bodies
In a speech delivered in Dublin on 20 June 2006 to the Institute of Public Administration, O'Reilly criticised "some service providers, both public and private" for retreating from dealing personally with the public through the use of call centres and the Internet. She mentioned the Irish Revenue Commissioners in this context, pointing out that a significant proportion of the clients of these bodies "do not have access to the web" and therefore the level of personal contact is inadequate as a consequence. She also believed that public access to information under the Freedom of Information Act had been "excessively curtailed", often in order to protect sectional interests, such as the performance of schools. She advised that the Act should be extended to include a number of public bodies previously exempted from the law, including the Garda Síochána, the Central Bank of Ireland and the National Asset Management Agency and that fees charged were a further inhibitor.

O'Reilly is the author of three books: Candidate: The Truth Behind the Presidential Campaign (1991), about President of Ireland Mary Robinson; Masterminds of the Right (1992) about political Catholicism in Ireland; and the controversial biography, Veronica Guerin (1998).

European Ombudsman
O'Reilly was appointed European Ombudsman by the European Parliament in 2013, and re-appointed in 2014 and 2019. Her current term expires in 2024.

Bibliography
 Veronica Guerin, Vintage, 1998. 
 Candidate: The Truth Behind the Presidential Campaign, Attic Press, 1991. 
 Masterminds of the Right, Attic Press, 1992.

References

External links
 Ombudsman Profile

Year of birth missing (living people)
Living people
Alumni of Trinity College Dublin
Alumni of University College Dublin
Irish magazine editors
Irish non-fiction writers
Irish women non-fiction writers
Irish women journalists
Magill people
Nieman Fellows
Ombudsmen in the European Union
Ombudsmen in the Republic of Ireland
RTÉ people
Sunday Tribune people
The Irish Press people
The Irish Times people
Business Post people
Today FM presenters
20th-century Irish people
21st-century Irish people
2003 in Ireland
Irish women editors
Women magazine editors
Irish women radio presenters